The 2001 EHF Women's Cup Winners' Cup was the twenty-fifth edition of EHF's competition for women's handball national cup champions. It ran from January 6 to May 13, 2001.

Motor Zaporizhzhia defeated Nordstrand IF in the final to become the first Ukrainian team to win the competition.

Results

References

Women's EHF Cup Winners' Cup
2000 in handball
2001 in handball